Bandhabahal is a small town in the Jharsuguda district in Odisha, India. It has a number of coal mines, which come under Mahanadi Coalfields Limited (M.C.L).

Economy
 Mahanadi Coalfields Limited (M.C.L)

Source of income
Most of the people work in coal mines. Some people are farmers and some are having their own businesses such as shops, suppliers, dealers, and retailers.

 Coal Transportation
Mostly Heavy Vehicles are used to transport coal from mines to other places.
 Maa Samalei Truck Owners Association widely known as MSTOA and Bandhabahal Truck and Tipper Owners Association is engaged for helping transporters in LKP, BOCM, LILARI Opencast mines in transportation of coals to local and other places.

Attractions
 Jagannath Temple
 Open Cast Coal Mines
 Ratha Yatra
 BIG Dumpher Section
 EMCL Coal Washery
 Dhanuyatra

Nearest tourist interests
 Odisha 2nd Highest Jagannath Temple Bandhabahal
 Koilighughar waterfall (Lakhanpur)
 Historical Kolabira Fort
 The Airport established during the World War 2
 Kali Mandir, K.M.Road, Jharsuguda
 JRD TATA Park, Belpahar, Jharsuguda
 Lal Patthar, Belpahar
 Temple Courtyard and sculptures
 Golf ground, bandhabahal
 CHANDI MANDIR, BRAJRAJNAGAR

Festivals
 Dhanu Jatra
 Danda Nacha
 Rath Yatra
 Ganesh Puja
 Vishwakarma Puja
 Durga Puja
 Chhath Puja

Education 
 Schools
 Bandhabahal P.U.P. School
 DAV Public School
 Bandhabahal High School
 Bandhabahal UP School
 Saraswati Sishu Mandir

Police outpost
 Bandhabahal Police Out Post

Transport
 By Road this place is well connected with all major towns in Odisha
 The Nearest Railway Station is Belpahar.
 The Nearest Airport is Bhubaneswar now Jharsuguda.

Distance from places
 Belpahar - 11 km
 Brajrajnagar - 18 km
 Jharsuguda - 35 km
 Sundargarh - 64 km
 Sambalpur - 80.3 km
 Bhubaneswer - 400 km
 IB Thermal-07 km

References

External links
 Bandhabahal Face Book Page

Cities and towns in Jharsuguda district